Roads and Bridges is a 2000 film by Abraham Lim about a Chinese-American man facing racial prejudice in the American Midwest. Lim plays the main character, Johnson Lee, a Chinese-American man who is placed on a Kansas road-cleaning crew by his parole officer. The film is about the friendship between Lee (played by Lim) and Darrell (played by Gregory Sullivan), a black man who has experienced years of racist treatment from the white co-workers on the road crew. Lee is also the subject of racist treatment by the road crew. After Darrell rescues Lee from a river, the two men become friends. Other actors include Matt Malloy, Soon-Tek Oh, Jim Akman, Emmet Brennan, and Joe Michaelski. It was produced by Marc H. Glick and Lim, with Robert Altman, Glick, and Lim as executive producers. In addition to directing, Lim also wrote and edited the film. The music is by Bradford Athey and Adam Gorgoni.

Production 
Production took six years to complete and went through three directors of photography. Lim and his crew took many trips from New York to Kansas to shoot the film. Robert Altman later came on as an executive producer after Lim edited for him on Cookie's Fortune (1999).

The story is inspired by Lim's experience with a road crew in 1984 wherein he befriended Daryl, a Black man, and faced various forms of racism.

Reception
Variety praised "Lim’s captivating, though sometimes heavy-handed" film, saying that it "succeeds in large part because of its social intelligence and core of well-delineated characters". The Daily Northwestern praised the excellent performances of Lim and Sullivan and, while noting that the six-year "length of shooting shows in the film’s evolving aesthetic, with some scenes looking amateur and others well-executed", states that the director has dealt with a "tough subject [(racism)] with aplomb".

Ted Shen for the Chicago Reader said that although the voice-overs were overly sentimental, the "twists and turns of the men's unfolding friendship are astutely paced" and "languid, stifling atmosphere of a backwater town" are meticulously crafted.

The film won the top prize at the Toronto Reel Asian International Film Festival as a western.

References

American drama road movies
Asian-American drama films
Films about racism
Films set in Kansas
Films directed by Abraham Lim
2000s drama road movies
2000 directorial debut films
2000 films
2000s American films